Solyony is a rural locality (a settlement) in Prikaspiysky Selsoviet, Narimanovsky District, Astrakhan Oblast, Russia. The population was 86 as of 2010. There is one street.

Geography 
Solyony is located 115 km southwest of Narimanov (the district's administrative centre) by road. Prikaspiysky is the nearest rural locality.

References 

Rural localities in Narimanovsky District